The Borshchahivka is a river in Ukraine, flowing through the city of Kyiv and suburban Bucha Raion of Kyiv Oblast. It is a right tributary of the Irpin in the Dnieper basin.

Names 
 Borshchahivka – the modern name.
 Zhelian – mentioned in Hypatian Codex.
 Nyvka – variant of the name.
 Nova Hreblia – old name; mentioned on old maps.

References and footnotes

Rivers of Kyiv
Rivers of Kyiv Oblast